György Deák-Bárdos (1905 in Budapest – 1991) was a Hungarian composer, organist, singer and music teacher. He was the younger brother of Lajos Bárdos.

Works, editions and recordings
 10 masses
 70 cantatas, motets
 Parasceve Suite:
1. Hymnus De Vanitate Mundi (1930)
2. Tristis Est Anima Mea (1927)
3. Crucifigatur, Pater! Dimitte Illis! (1928)
4. Eli, Eli! (1928)
5. Consummatum Est (1928)

References

Hungarian composers
Hungarian male composers
1905 births
1991 deaths
Musicians from Budapest
20th-century composers
20th-century Hungarian male musicians